The MacArthur Bridge spans the Detroit River in Detroit, Michigan. The bridge, which features nineteen total arches across , provides main access between the city’s mainland and Belle Isle. Completed in 1923 for $2.635 million, it replaced an iron bridge with wooden decking that accidentally caught fire and was destroyed in 1915. The bridge, popularly known as the Belle Isle Bridge, was originally named the George Washington Bridge and renamed the Douglas MacArthur Bridge after General Douglas MacArthur in 1942. It was restored in 1986 at a cost of $11.5 million.

In 1913, William Edmund Scripps (of the Scripps publishing family), flew a Curtiss Aeroplane and Motor Company flying boat underneath the original Belle Isle Bridge.

Two sets of streetcar tracks were built into the east side of the bridge but a streetcar route was never implemented. The tracks were eventually paved over in the 1950s.

Photo gallery

References

External links 

Open-spandrel deck arch bridges in the United States
Bridges in Detroit
Detroit River
Bridges completed in 1923
Road bridges in Michigan
Concrete bridges in the United States
Belle Isle Park (Michigan)
1923 establishments in Michigan